The Israel Defense Forces (IDF) has a unique rank structure. Because the IDF is an integrated force, ranks are the same in all services (there is no differentiation between army, navy, air force, etc.) This is reflected in the slightly compacted rank structure: for instance, the Chief of Staff is seemingly only equivalent to a lieutenant general in other militaries.

Commissioned officer ranks 
The rank insignia of commissioned officers.

Officers: Volunteers who have completed the officer's course. Officers serve for at least 36 months (3 years) for women in non-combat positions and 44 months (3 years, 8 months) for men. Positions in specialized units require their officers to serve for more than this (for example, seven years for pilots). Promotions are based on ability and time served. It takes about a year to be promoted from 2nd lieutenant to 1st lieutenant and three years to be promoted from 1st lieutenant to captain. Army officers have bronze-metal insignia (replaced with subdued black-metal insignia in 2002), air force officers have silver metal insignia, and navy officers have gold-metal insignia or gold braid bars.

Academic officers: Special rank given to soldiers who are delaying completing officers' training so they can complete a professional education (usually in engineering, medicine, or law). Officers of these ranks are considered professional manpower and rarely take posts of command. Upon finally completing officers' training, an academic officer is immediately awarded the corresponding next "real" rank due to their experience in grade. Their insignia bars are embossed with scrolls rather than laurel branches.

Other ranks 
The rank insignia of non-commissioned officers and enlisted personnel.

Non-commissioned officers: The professional non-commissioned and warrant ranks, drawn from volunteers who signed on for military service after completing conscription.

Enlisted: The conscript and field NCO ranks. All Jewish or Druze conscripts must start their compulsory service at 18 (unless they receive a deferment); Christians, Muslims, and Circassians may volunteer at 17 or older. Enlisted male conscripts serve for 32 months (2 years and 8 months) and female conscripts serve for 24 months (2 years). In the IDF enlisted ranks are earned by means of time in service, rather than by a particular post or assignment. (This means that female conscripts reach no higher than  during their compulsory service, unless they serve in combat positions or volunteer for longer terms.)

Field NCOs ( and ) who command sub-units (fire team or squad, respectively) are called . This is an abbreviation that translates into English literally as "non-commissioned officer". It is a term of respect like the French Army's  ("chief").

Recruits: Upon enlistment to military service in Israel, all soldiers begin a basic training course and undergo several weeks or months of 'integration' from citizens to soldiers.

Both officers and enlisted personnel have an obligation to serve in the Reserves after completing their active military service. Male personnel serve until 41–51 years old while female personnel serve until 24 years old.

Obsolete ranks 

The rank was considered below a 2nd lieutenant. It indicated a cadet in the Israeli army who had finished the basic preparation for an officer rank, but for some reason abandoned their studies, failed to complete the professional officer preparation, or completed it with a minimal passing grade but was still found worthy of command. They occupied the lowest officer posts until a normal officer rank was found for the position. Those who finished the officer preparation with a minimal passing grade and were substituting in a command position were eligible for promotion to normal officer rank after a set period. It was discontinued in 1994.

It was the equivalent of a US Army First Sergeant.

There was an expansion of staff NCO ranks during this period and the higher rank was offered to conscripts who planned to enlist after completing their national service.

It still continued to be used in the Reserves until it was finally discontinued in 1999. Privates now retain their rank until promoted to corporal, usually after 10 months of peacetime service or 6 months for support roles or 4 months for combatants during hostilities. Corporals in combat units traditionally do not wear their rank insignia, remaining without insignia until they are promoted to the rank of sergeant.

Insignia 
Aiguillettes,  in Hebrew are worn on the left shoulder* of the uniform to indicate a soldier's specific role a unit:
 Azure/ Orange: Search and Rescue
 Black/ Green: Commanders in the Section/ Squad Commanders’ Course
 Black/ Yellow: Instructor in Chemical Warfare
 Black: Commanders in the Officer Courses/ Advance Courses
 Blue/ Red: Military Police
 Blue/ White: Chief Sergeant of a Base
 Brown: Analyst
 Dark Blue: Navy Instructors
 Gold or Blue/white: Discipline Attaché
 Green: Section/ Squad Commander
 Grey: Educators/ Teachers (in the Education and Youth Corp)
 Pink: Multimedia Producer or Officer in an Educational Course 
 Purple: Service Rights Attaché
 Purple/ Blue: Reservist Attaché
 Red: IDF Orchestra (*Right Shoulder), Navy Instructor (Left Shoulder)
 White: Security Guards
 Yellow/ White: Field Intelligence Personnel

(Only in Shocarim Cadet Schools in the IAF)
 Light Blue: Commander of a class
  Dark Blue:  Senior Commander of a class/Commander of a grade
  Grey:  Private Teachers
(Only in Shocarim Navy Cadet Schoolds in the IN)
 Red: Commander of a class
 Green: Household officer
 Red/ Yellow: Base Chief
 Red/ Black: Base Chief's right hand
 Red/ Green: Adjutant
 Dark Blue: Class Instructor
 Red/ White: head of the Cadet's council
 Dark Green/ Black: Chief of security

History 
When the IDF was created in 1948, there were 7 enlisted and NCO ranks, and 8 officer ranks. The ranks were as follows:

IDF Ranks and their insignia were initially influenced by the British / Commonwealth model. This was due to the average Israeli servicemen's experience in the Commonwealth forces during World War Two. This was later reformed when the IDF started to adopt a rank system similar to the United States armed forces in 1973 and the 1990s.

Rank insignia were originally cut from cloth or embroidered onto cloth patches. Bronze-metal officer's rank insignia worn on a red cloth backing were introduced for the army in 1949. Enlisted stripes for all arms were originally individual white half-chevrons with space between them. In an economy move, senior NCOs were distinguished by using the same bronze insignia (an oak-leaf or oak-leaf-in-a-wreath) as senior officers pinned to their sleeve insignia. In 1951 the Navy adopted golden-yellow half-chevrons and the Air Force adopted blue half chevrons.

A  was equal to a British Army staff sergeant / colour sergeant or a US Army technical sergeant (sergeant first class) / platoon sergeant. For the other services, the bronze-metal oak-leaf on the army's  rank insignia was replaced with a yellow anchor in a white hexagon for the Navy and a blue Star of David on a white circle for the Air Force. This was later replaced in 1951 with a gold-metal oak leaf for the Navy and a silver-metal oak leaf for the Air Force.

A  (1948–1951) was equivalent to a US Army First Sergeant. The rank insignia was a small bronze oak leaf in a wreath on 3 white half-chevrons for the Army; a yellow anchor in a yellow-bordered (1948) or solid-yellow (1950) hexagon on 3 white half-chevrons for the Navy; and a blue Star of David in a blue-bordered circle on 3 white half-chevrons for the Air Force. It was replaced by the reorganized  rank in 1951 and the new  rank by 1955.

A  (1951–1967) was equivalent to a British Army Warrant Officer II (Company Sergeant Major). The rank insignia was an Oak Leaf in a Laurel Wreath. It came in bronze-metal on a red enamel backing for the Army, gold-metal for the Navy, and silver-metal for the Air Force. It was worn on the lower right sleeve of the shirt or jacket or on a leather wrist strap when wearing short-sleeve order.

A  (1948–1951) was equivalent to a US Army Master Sergeant or Sergeant Major. The rank insignia was originally an oak leaf in a laurel wreath for the Army, a large yellow anchor in a yellow-bordered (1948) or solid-yellow (1950) hexagon for the Navy, and a large blue Star of David in a bordered circle for the Air Force. The rank was renamed  (1951–Present) and was equivalent to a British Army Warrant Officer I (Regimental Sergeant Major). The new rank also received new insignia made of metal: an Oak Leaf over a vertical Sword in a Laurel Wreath. It came in bronze-metal on a red enamel backing for the Army, gold-metal for the Navy, and silver-metal for the Air Force. It was worn on the lower right sleeve of the shirt or jacket or on a leather wrist strap when wearing short-sleeve order.

Early ranks of the IDF (1948–1951) 
From 1948 to 1951, IDF Ranks for each branch of service (the Ground, Sea, and Air Forces) had unique titles and distinct insignia.

See also 
 Israel Defense Forces insignia
 List of comparative military ranks

References 

 

Israel
Israel Defense Forces
Command and control